The women's épée category B fencing competition at the 2012 Summer Paralympics was held on 5 September 2012 at the ExCeL Exhibition Centre in London. This class was for athletes who had good trunk control and their fencing arm was not affected by their impairment.

Schedule 
All times are British Summer Time (UTC+1)

Competition format
The tournament started with a group phase round-robin followed by a knockout stage. During a qualification round-robin, bouts last a maximum of three minutes, or until one athlete has scored five hits. There is then a knockout phase, in which bouts last a maximum of nine minutes (three periods of three minutes), or until one athlete has scored 15 hits.

Results

Qualification

Pool A

Pool B

Finals

External links
Wheelchair Fencing – Schedule & Results 
Women's Individual Épée – Category B 

Wheelchair fencing at the 2012 Summer Paralympics
Para